Lasiurus is a genus of bats in the family Vespertilionidae. Its members are known as hairy-tailed bats or red bats.

Phylogeny
The following is the relationship of the three genera formerly included within Lasiurus, based on an analysis of nuclear and mitochondrial DNA.

Species
There are currently 13 described species in Lasiurus:
 Lasiurus arequipae  — Arequipa cinnamon red bat
 Lasiurus atratus (Handley, 1996) — greater red bat
 Lasiurus blossevillii (Lesson and Garnot, 1826) — southern red bat
 Lasiurus borealis (Müller, 1776) — eastern red bat
 Lasiurus castaneus (Handley, 1960) — Tacarcuna bat
 Lasiurus degelidus (Miller, 1931) — Jamaican red bat
 Lasiurus ebenus (Fazzolari-Correa, 1994) — hairy-tailed bat
 Lasiurus frantzii — western red bat
 Lasiurus minor (Miller, 1931)— minor red bat
 Lasiurus pfeifferi (Gundlach, 1861)— Pfeiffer's red bat
 Lasiurus salinae (Thomas, 1902)— saline red bat
 Lasiurus seminolus (Rhoads, 1895) — Seminole bat
 Lasiurus varius — cinnamon red bat

References

 
Bat genera
Vesper bats
Taxa named by John Edward Gray